David & David (stylized as David + David) was an American rock duo composed of Los Angeles-based studio musicians David Baerwald and David Ricketts. They are best known for their debut single "Welcome to the Boomtown" from the album Boomtown. The single reached #37 on the Billboard Hot 100 in 1986 and #8 on the Billboard Top Rock Tracks chart. It also peaked at 27 in Australia.

Boomtown was produced by Davitt Sigerson. The album peaked at #39 on the Billboard 200 and was certified gold in the U.S. by the RIAA. The follow-up single, "Swallowed by the Cracks" reached #14 on the Billboard Top Rock Tracks chart, while "Ain't So Easy" peaked at #51 on the Billboard Hot 100 and #17 on the Billboard Top Rock Tracks chart.

David & David disbanded shortly after Boomtown, and Baerwald and Ricketts continued to work with other musicians. They both collaborated with Sheryl Crow on her debut LP, Tuesday Night Music Club.

In 2016 it was reported that the duo were working on a second album. The project has since stalled, with no plans to resume.

Discography

Studio albums
Boomtown (1986)

Singles

References

External links
[ AllMusic]

American pop music groups
American musical duos
Musicians from Los Angeles